Eleruwa is the title of the traditional ruler of Eruwa in Western Nigeria. The last Eleruwa, Oba Samuel Adebayo Adegbola was installed in 1998 but deposed in November 29, 2019 by the Supreme Court of Nigeria.

List of Eleruwa
	Obaseeku – Ododo baba ewu
	Olaribikusi I – Oba a gesin sawo
	Olasubu – Akangbe osin
	Gbajumola I – Afasan (reigned till about 1860)
	Sabi – Ayinla Edu
	Olurin – Iyanda Agan
	Omoni – Alade Efon
	Sangotola I
	Bankole-Akangbe Agan (died in 1911)
	Ajao "Oti" reigned from 1911 to 1921 (deposed)
	Bammeke "Alabi Agan" (1921–1937)
	Fasina Akindele Ajani Sangotola II (1938 – 4th Dec. 1944)
	Adegboye (1947 to 1959)
	Solomon Olarnrewaju Olaribikusi II (1960–1969)
	Bolanle Olaniyan Gbajumola II (Nov. 25, 1972 to 1994)
	Samuel Adebayo Adegbola Akindele I (1998-29th Nov.,2019). He was deposed by Supreme Court.

References